Wien Franz-Josefs-Bahnhof (translated as Vienna Franz Joseph Station, abbreviated as Wien FJB) is a train station in the Alsergrund district of Vienna, Austria. It serves as the southern terminus of the Emperor Franz Joseph Railway.

History

A first provisional terminus opened with the inauguration of the first section of the Emperor Franz Joseph Railway from Vienna to Eggenburg in 1870. The Kaiser-Franz-Josefs-Bahnhof, lavishly designed in a historicist Ringstraße style, was built at the present site from 1872 onwards and finished six years later. In 1907 it received access to the Vienna tramway network providing a direct connection to the Westbahnhof, Nordwestbahnhof, Nordbahnhof (Praterstern) railway stations.

During World War II it was damaged by strategic bombing and a blaze in April 1945, nevertheless it was the first of the Vienna main railway stations to resume operations after the war. Re-erected in a simple manner, the reception building served as a backdrop for the 1968 film Mayerling starring Omar Sharif and Catherine Deneuve. The desolate structure was finally demolished in 1974. The new station building, including large-scale office facilities above the tracks, was inaugurated in 1978. The adjacent Althanstraße (UZA) lecture hall complex of the Vienna University was finished in 1995.

Operational usage
Formerly the terminal station of the international Vindobona train from Berlin Ostbahnhof via Dresden and Prague, Franz-Josefs-Bahnhof today serves as a regional train station, used by Regional-Express trains to Krems, Gmünd, Tulln, and to České Velenice in the Czech Republic. It is the terminus of the Vienna S-Bahn line S40 to St. Pölten Hauptbahnhof. Since the 2022/23 timetable, it will also serve as the terminus of international "Silva Nortica" trains from Prague.

The station also hosts a grocery store supplying the local population outside regular shopping hours.

References

External links

Franz Josefs Bahnhof
Buildings and structures in Alsergrund